CFL on CTV was a presentation of Canadian Football League football aired on the CTV Television Network from 1962 to 1986. CTV dropped coverage of the CFL after the 1986 season. CTV's coverage was replaced by TSN and the newly created Canadian Football Network.

History

Background
In February 1961, John Bassett, Chairman of CFTO-TV, outbid the CBC for the Eastern Conference regular season and playoff television rights, and a first refusal for the Grey Cup, with an offer of $375,000 a season for two years.

Affiliation agreements
Meanwhile, Spence Caldwell, was trying to persuade new private stations to sign affiliation agreements with him so that he could form a network. Bassett initially refused, but when several stations had given Caldwell signed letters of intent to become affiliates and Bassett failed to get a temporary network licence from the Board of Broadcast Governors, he agreed to join the new network. Caldwell went to the BBG and was granted his network licence, which gave Bassett access to a network on which to broadcast his CFL games.

Grey Cup coverage
From 1962 until 1986, CBC and CTV simulcast the Grey Cup. In 1962, 1965, 1967, 1968 and 1970, CTV commentators were used for the dual network telecast. In 1963, 1964, 1966 and 1969 CBC announcers were provided. From 1971 until 1986, the two networks fully pooled their commentary teams for the game, with one crew calling the first half, and the other crew calling the second half.

After the 1986 season, CTV dropped its coverage of the CFL and the Grey Cup.

Although the CFL has not returned to CTV since, TSN has held exclusive broadcasting rights to the CFL since 2007. As TSN is now owned by Bell Media which is also the parent company of CTV, CTV heavily promotes TSN's CFL coverage.

Commentators
Johnny Esaw - Play-By-Play (1962–1973), Host (1974–1986)
Pat Marsden - Sideline Reporter/Host (1968–1973), Play-By-Play (1974–1986)
Al McCann - Play-By-Play/Host/Reporter (1963–1986)
Dale Isaac - Play-By-Play
Don Chevrier - Play-By-Play (1981–1986)
Gene Filipski - Colour Commentator/Host (1967–1968)
Bill Bewley - Colour Commentator (1968)
Dick Shatto - Colour Commentator (1970–1973)
Wally Gabler - Colour Commentator (1974)
Mike Wadsworth - Colour Commentator (1975–1981)
Frank Rigney - Colour Commentator (1978–1986)
Bernie Pascall - Colour, Host, Reporter (1969-1980)
Leif Pettersen - Colour Commentator (1982–1986)
Annis Stukus - Colour Commentator (1965)
Jack Gotta - Colour Commentator (1984)
Tom McKee - Host (1975–1986)
Bill Stephenson - Sideline Reporter (1972–1986)
Terry Lynne Meyer - Sideline Reporter
Dan Matheson - Host
Joe Spence - Colour Commentator
Jack Wells - Play-By-Play
John Wells - Play-By-Play
Bob Gillingham - Sideline Reporter

References 

Sports telecast series
CTV Television Network original programming
Canadian Football League on television
1962 Canadian television series debuts
1986 Canadian television series endings
CTV Sports
1960s Canadian sports television series
1970s Canadian sports television series
1980s Canadian sports television series